Krasnoyary is a rural locality (a village) in Ivanchinskoye Rural Settlement, Gaynsky District, Perm Krai, Russia. The population was 4 as of 2010.

Geography 
Krasnoyary is located 43 km southwest of Gayny (the district's administrative centre) by road. Krasny Yar is the nearest rural locality.

References 

Rural localities in Gaynsky District